San Miguel, officially the Municipality of San Miguel,  is a 4th class municipality in the province of Bohol, Philippines. According to the 2020 census, it has a population of 25,356 people.

San Miguel is located in the northern interior of the province. It is 86 kilometers (two to three hours bus ride) from Tagbilaran with a total land area of  bounded in the north by the municipality of Trinidad, in the south by the municipality of Dagohoy, in the west municipality of Danao and in the east by the municipality of Ubay.

San Miguel has eighteen barangays and has an estimated population of more than 24,000. The western portion of the municipality is generally hilly while the eastern portions are level lands primarily cultivated for agriculture.

The town of San Miguel, Bohol celebrates its feast on May 10, to honor the town patron Saint Michael.

History 

The Municipality was established in July 1961 by virtue of Executive Order No. 423 dated 14 March 1961. Its mother town is the municipality of Trinidad which also was formerly barrio Ipil of the Municipality of Talibon. The seat of government in the San Miguel was formerly Cambangay Sur which was formerly a part of Talibon when the latter became a pueblo during the Spanish regime.

The place which is now the town site was one a forest area teeming with all kinds of games. The early years of American regime saw the migration of a handful of natives from Ipil which was settlement in the north along the Ipil River. The search for greener pastures brought more settlers into the area. The bulk of migrants came from the municipality of Loon.

San Miguel got its name from St. Michael the Archangel, the town's patron saint.

Geography

Barangays
San Miguel comprises 18 barangays:

Climate

Demographics

Economy

Government
Since its township, 9 mayors have been elected into office.

Mayors of San Miguel

 Enrique Alvarez
 Mateo Almedilla
 Teodorico Palma
 Mauricio Bonior
 Segundino Hencianos
 Hermogenes Ricafort(acted as OIC Mayor after the EDSA Revolution)
 Silvino Evangelista
 Claudio Bonior
 Nunila Mendez-Pinat
 Atty. Virgilio Mendez

References

External links
 [ Philippine Standard Geographic Code]
San Miguel

Municipalities of Bohol
Establishments by Philippine executive order